James Walls (born 1892) was a Scottish footballer. He played with Rangers as a wing half.

Walls, nicknamed "'Fister", made 106 league and Scottish Cup appearances for the club during a six-year spell, scoring four goals. Walls had a testimonial at Ibrox on 7 April 1925 against Newcastle United which Rangers won 1–0.

References

External links
Details of Rangers career
Walls, James at Rangers FitbaStats

Year of death unknown
1892 births
Scottish footballers
Rangers F.C. players
Association football midfielders
Scottish Football League players